Rupprecht of the Palatinate or Ruprecht of the Palatinate may refer to:

 Prince Rupert of the Rhine (Duke of Cumberland) (1619–1682)

 Ruprecht of the Palatinate (Bishop of Freising) (1481–1504)

 Ruprecht of the Palatinate (Archbishop of Cologne) (1427–1480)
 Prince Rupert of the Rhine (1619–1682), known in German as Prinz Ruprecht von der Pfalz
 Rupert, King of Germany (1352–1410)
 Rupert I, Elector Palatine, "the Red" (1309–1390)
 Rupert II, Elector Palatine (1325–1398)